The Nassau Championship is a preseason college basketball tournament, first held in 2017, designed strictly for mid-major NCAA Division I programs. The first two years were played at Kendal Isaacs National Gymnasium. in Nassau, Bahamas. The 2019 Tournament was moved to Baha Mar Convention Center due to damage Kendal Isaacs National Gymnasium suffered during Hurricane Dorian.

Tournament History

Champions

Brackets

2022

2021 
Abilene Christian had to withdraw from the Nassau Championship due to a COVID-19 issue on the ACU team. The tournament continued as planned with a seven team field (with no seventh place game), and the bottom half of the bracket was reseeded. Coastal Carolina received a first round bye.

2019

2018

2017 
The field of eight teams that competed in the inaugural event was unveiled on 29 September 2017. The tournament began on 17 November and concluded on 19 November.

References

External links 
Official site of The Nassau Championship

College men's basketball competitions in the United States
College basketball competitions
2017 establishments in the Bahamas
Basketball in the Bahamas